Zehmarad Afzal (born 24 October 1977) is a Pakistani former cricketer who played as an all-rounder, batting right-handed and bowling right-arm medium-fast. She appeared in one Test match and 23 One Day Internationals for Pakistan between 2000 and 2004. She played domestic cricket for Islamabad in Pakistan, as well as Warwickshire, Cheshire, Northamptonshire and Worcestershire in England.

References

External links
 
 

1977 births
Living people
Cricketers from Bahawalpur
Pakistan women Test cricketers
Pakistan women One Day International cricketers
Islamabad women cricketers
Warwickshire women cricketers
Cheshire women cricketers
Northamptonshire women cricketers
Worcestershire women cricketers